Theodor Thomsen (20 March 1904 – 14 May 1982) was a German sailor. He competed for Germany at the 1952 Summer Olympics and won a bronze medal in the Dragon Class with Erich Natusch and Georg Nowka. He also competed for Germany at the 1936 Summer Olympics and for the United Team of Germany at the 1956 Summer Olympics.

References
 

1904 births
1982 deaths
Sportspeople from Kiel
German male sailors (sport)
Olympic sailors of Germany
Olympic sailors of the United Team of Germany
Olympic bronze medalists for Germany
Olympic medalists in sailing
Medalists at the 1952 Summer Olympics
Sailors at the 1936 Summer Olympics – 6 Metre
Sailors at the 1952 Summer Olympics – Dragon
Sailors at the 1956 Summer Olympics – Dragon